New Boy is an EP released by the American pop rock band The Connells. Along with the title song, the EP includes the Jethro Tull cover "Living in the Past" and two tracks recorded live at Purple Dragon Studio in Atlanta, Georgia, for broadcast on Live X (WNNX).

Track listing

"New Boy" (Mike Connell) - 4:39
"Logan Street" (Connell) - 3:40
"Wonder Why" (Connell) - 3:14
"Living in the Past" (Ian Anderson) – 2:44
"Fun & Games" (live) (Connell, Doug MacMillan) – 3:07
"New Boy" (live) (Connell) – 4:43

Personnel 

David Connell – bass
Mike Connell – guitar
George Huntley – guitar, vocals
Doug MacMillan – vocals
Steve Potak - keyboards
Peele Wimberley – drums

The Connells albums
1990 EPs
TVT Records EPs